Dunia Aku Punya (meaning The World Is Mine) is the debut studio album by Indonesian singer-songwriter Anggun. It was released by Billboard Indonesia in 1986, when she was 14 years old. The album was produced by Indonesian rock musician Ian Antono and features various songwriters, including Anggun herself, who wrote two songs. "Tegang" and "Dunia Aku Punya" were released as promotional singles from the album.

Although it was not the first album Anggun had ever recorded, Dunia Aku Punya is the first commercially released album of her career. Previously, Anggun recorded a children's album in 1983 entitled Kepada Alam & Penciptanya, but it was not published at the time. After Anggun reached the spotlight in the early 1990s, the children's album was later released by Musica Studios without her authorization.

Production and release
In 1983, Anggun recorded her first ever album, entitled Kepada Alam & Penciptanya. The children's album features cover versions of ballads by Indonesian country singer Ritta Rubby Hartland. However, Anggun was disappointed at the time because her producer did not publish the album. After Anggun reached the spotlight in the early 1990s, the children's album was later released by Musica Studios without her authorization.

Dunia Aku Punya was released by Billboard Indonesia in 1986. It is credited as Anggun's official debut album on its cover sleeve. The album was produced by Indonesian famous rock guitarist and producer, Ian Antono. Beside Ian, there were also Areng Widodo, Appin Astrid, Yessy Robot, Andy Nasution, Amin Ivo's, Ariyanto, Ade Ibat, Ully Sigar Rusady, and Darto Singo (Anggun's father) who composed the songs of the album. Anggun also wrote two songs on the album, "Tegang" and "Tik Tak Tik Tuk".

The songs on this album has a variety, with some songs telling about national spirit ("Garudaku"), peace ("Perdamaian") and about woman ("Dari Seorang Wanita"). The album spawned two radio singles, "Tegang" and "Dunia Aku Punya". The song "Tegang" was written by Anggun and her father, Darto Singo, and "Dunia Aku Punya" was written by Yessy Robot. The album did not perform well commercially, and Anggun later reached the success with her 1989 hit "Mimpi". In 1990, after Anggun peaked her popularity in Indonesia, the album was re-released with the title Tegang, with the same track listing but different cover artwork.

Track listing

References

1986 debut albums
Anggun albums
Indonesian-language albums